Auchindachy railway station served the village of Auchindachy in Scotland. Served by the Keith and Dufftown railway, it was the last station before Keith Town and Keith Junction where the line met the Great North of Scotland line that ran from Keith to Elgin.

History
Opened by the Keith and Dufftown Railway (GNoSR). Then station passed on to the London and North Eastern Railway during the Grouping of 1923. Passing on to the Scottish Region of British Railways during the nationalisation of 1948, it was then closed by the British Railways Board.

The site today
The old railway buildings and platform remain next to the track. The buildings are now privately owned and lived in. The preserved Keith and Dufftown Railway runs pass this former station en route.

References 
  

  
Station on navigable O. S. map
 Pictures of the station recently

External links
Video footage of the station
Keith and Dufftown Railway

Disused railway stations in Moray
Railway stations in Great Britain opened in 1862
Railway stations in Great Britain closed in 1968
Beeching closures in Scotland
Former Great North of Scotland Railway stations
1862 establishments in Scotland